Charles V. Payne (born ) is an American Fox Business Network financial journalist and host of Fox's Making Money with Charles Payne.

Early life and education
At 17 years old, he enlisted in the United States Air Force and went on to serve as a security policeman stationed at Minot Air Force Base in Minot, North Dakota. Payne attended Minot State University and Central Texas College while in the service.

Career

Finance industry 
Payne began his career on Wall Street as an analyst at E. F. Hutton in 1985. Payne is the chief executive officer and principal financial analyst of Wall Street Strategies, a stock market research firm he founded in 1991.

In 1999, Payne settled with the SEC over a complaint alleging that on at least eight occasions, Wall Street Strategies recommended that its clients purchase members stock through recorded messages on its telephonic stock recommendation service. The complaint also alleged that Payne failed to disclose that he received payments from members to promote members stock. Without admitting or denying the alleged violations, Payne consented to the entry of a permanent injunction against violations of Section 17(b) of the Securities Act of 1933. In addition, Payne agreed to pay a civil penalty of $25,000.

In 2007, Payne released his first book titled Be Smart, Act Fast, Get Rich: Your Game Plan for Getting It Right in the Stock Market. He has made several appearances on C-SPAN.

Fox Business 
In 2007, Payne joined Fox Business as a contributor. In 2014, he became the host of Making Money with Charles Payne.

In June 2019, Payne claimed, "When President Obama was elected, the market crashed … Trump was up 9%, President Obama was down 14.8% and President Bush was down almost 4%. There is an instant reaction on Wall Street." PolitiFact described the claim as "mostly false", noting that while the numbers put forth are correct experts dismiss the causal claims put forth by Payne, and instead attribute the market crash to broader economic forces and long-term trends.

Rape accusation 
In July 2017, Payne was suspended by Fox Business pending an investigation after a former network guest, Scottie Nell Hughes, accused him of rape. Payne denied the charge, but acknowledged having had a three-year-long "romantic relationship" with Hughes before the accusation was made. Hughes, who kept an apartment near Fox's Manhattan headquarters for the duration of the affair, claimed she believed it would help her obtain a permanent position at the network. Her appearances were drastically reduced after she ended the affair in 2015 and reported Payne to Fox. On , Payne's suspension was lifted.

Personal life
Payne is a resident of Teaneck, New Jersey. He is married to Yvonne Payne.

See also
 Black conservatism in the United States

References

External links

1960 births
African-American journalists
American chief executives
American company founders
American financial commentators
American male journalists
Central Texas College alumni
EF Hutton people
Fox Business people
Living people
Minot State University alumni
New Jersey Republicans
People from Teaneck, New Jersey
Place of birth missing (living people)
United States Air Force airmen
Black conservatism in the United States